Haruku Island is an island in Central Maluku Regency, Maluku Province, Indonesia - lying east of Ambon Island, off the southern coast of Seram and just west of Saparua. It is administered as a single district, Kecamatan Pulau Haruku, with a 2010 census population of 24,207 and a 2020 Census population of 27,390. The inhabitants of Haruku speak the Haruku language, as well as Indonesian and Ambonese Malay.

There are six Christian (Aboru, Haruku, Hulaliu, Kariu, Oma and Wassu) and five Muslim (Kabau, Kailolo, Pelauw, Rohomoni and Samet) villages on the island. As on most of the islands of the Moluccas, spices such as nutmeg, cloves, cumin and ginger are grown as cash crops.

In 1527, the Portuguese were the first Europeans to reach the island. The Dutch followed in 1590 and established Fort New Zealand, whose ruins are now a tourist attraction. During World War II, the Japanese established a Prisoner-of-war camp for captive Australians and British forces on the island, who were used as forced labor to build an airstrip.

References

External links

Old map of Manipa, Haruku, Saparua and Nusalaut

Islands of the Maluku Islands
Landforms of Maluku (province)